Frederic George Barlow was a member of the Wisconsin State Assembly during the 1878 session. Other positions he held include Chairman (similar to Mayor) of Rock Creek, Wisconsin. He was a Republican. Barlow was born on July 26, 1839, in Stratford, New Hampshire.

References

People from Coös County, New Hampshire
People from Dunn County, Wisconsin
Mayors of places in Wisconsin
Republican Party members of the Wisconsin State Assembly
1839 births
Year of death missing